Spaghetti a la Mode is a 1915 American short comedy film featuring Oliver Hardy.

Plot

Cast
 Will Louis as Antonio
 Oliver Hardy as Cook (as Babe Hardy)
 Vincente DePascale as Pascale
 Royal Byron as Brizzi
 Harry Lorraine as Proprietor
 Harry Rice as Waiter
 Pete Bell as Waiter

See also
 List of American films of 1915
 Oliver Hardy filmography

External links

1915 films
1915 comedy films
1915 short films
American silent short films
Silent American comedy films
American black-and-white films
Lubin Manufacturing Company films
American comedy short films
1910s American films